Antennaria densifolia, the denseleaf pussytoes, is a North American species of plants in the family Asteraceae. It is native to western Canada (Northwest Territories, Yukon, British Columbia, Alberta) and the US states of Alaska and Montana. It grows in subalpine-alpine limestone talus.

References

External links
Montana Field Guide, Montana Natural Heritage Program
Alaska Rare Plant Field Guide, Alaska Natural Heritage Program

densifolia
Plants described in 1945
Flora of Subarctic America
Flora of Western Canada
Flora of the Northwestern United States